John Garrard (c. 1546–1625) was a merchant and Lord Mayor of London for 1602–03.

John Garrard may also refer to:

Sir John Garrard, 1st Baronet (c. 1590–1637), of the Garrard baronets
Sir John Garrard, 2nd Baronet (died 1686), of the Garrard baronets
Sir John Garrard, 3rd Baronet (1638–1701), member of parliament for Amersham and Ludgershall

See also
Garrard (disambiguation)